Hydrangea paniculata, or panicled hydrangea, is a species of flowering plant in the family Hydrangeaceae native to southern and eastern China, Korea, Japan and Russia (Sakhalin). It was first formally described by Philipp Franz von Siebold in 1829.

Description

In late summer it bears large conical panicles of creamy white fertile flowers, together with pinkish-white sterile florets. Florets may open pale green, grading to white with age, thus creating a pleasing “two-tone” effect.

Cultivation

In cultivation it is pruned in spring to obtain larger flower heads.

Numerous cultivars have been developed for ornamental use, of which the following have gained the Royal Horticultural Society’s Award of Garden Merit:-
 ’Big Ben’
 ’Limelight’ (PBR)
 ’Phantom’
  = ‘Interhydia’
  = ‘Dvppinky’ (PBR)
 ’Silver Dollar’ (suitable for smaller gardens)

Those cultivars marked (PBR) are protected by plant breeders' rights from unauthorised propagation.

Other cultivars include:
 ‘Praecox,’ a particularly early flowering cultivar

Uses

Hydrangea paniculata is sometimes smoked as an intoxicant, despite the danger of illness and/or death due to the cyanide present as cyanogenic glycosides.

Etymology
Hydrangea is derived from Greek, meaning ‘water vessel’, in reference to the shape of the capsules.

Paniculata means ‘with branched-racemose or cymose inflorescences’, ‘tufted’, ‘paniculate’, or ‘with panicles’. This name is about the flowers of this species.

References

External links
 Friedman, William. "Eminent panicle hydrangeas." Posts from the Collections, Arnold Arboretum of Harvard University website, 15 July 2019. Retrieved 2 October 2019.
 Rose, Nancy. "A Parade of Hydrangeas." ARBlog, Arnold Arboretum of Harvard University website, 2 July 2016. Retrieved 2 October 2019.

Flora of China
Flora of Japan
Flora of Korea
Flora of Russia
paniculata
Plants described in 1829